Gems TV was an American reverse auction jewelry shopping channel.  The channel was available on DirecTV, Dish Network and other local networks.  The channel operations were based in Reno, Nevada.

History

Gems TV launched exclusively on DirecTV. On January 15, 2007, Gems TV also became available through select cable providers in the U.S. and some TV affiliates such as KLDT in Lake Dallas, Texas. The channel was also streamed live on the website. On August 30, 2007, Gems TV became available on Dish Network.

Bankruptcy and closure
In March 2010, it was announced that the US operation would close and be wound down. On April 7, 2010, Gems TV USA filed for Chapter 11 bankruptcy, blaming the Great Recession. Gems TV ceased broadcasting on April 15, 2010. The website and customer service team continued operating until May 6, 2010.

Criticism
On February 1, 2010, the manufacturing operations at its factory in Chanthaburi, Thailand were closed down due to the change in sourcing and manufacture. The new strategic decision to fully outsource its gemstone jewelry supply was aimed at reducing operating costs, increasing supply, improving manufacturing flexibility and the main reason of increasing profit margins. This was one of the principles the company was originally well known for - Going direct to the mines and handcrafting gem set jewelry in their own in-house facilities. The consequence of this has resulted in a large number of redundancies.

DirecTV has filed a lawsuit against Gems TV (USA) Limited, claiming that Gems TV refused to pay their satellite bills.

References

External links
Official site

See also
 Jewelry Television
 Gemporia

Defunct television networks in the United States
Television channels and stations established in 2006
Television channels and stations disestablished in 2010
2006 establishments in Nevada
2010 disestablishments in the United States
Shopping networks in the United States